WCMY 1430 kHz AM is a radio station licensed to Ottawa, Illinois, covering Northern Illinois, including LaSalle, Ottawa, and Streator. WCMY currently has a News Talk/Full Service format and is owned by NRG Media.  WCMY primarily features local programming; however, it does carry nationally syndicated shows as well, such as Lou Dobbs, Laura Ingraham, Jim Bohannon, and Coast to Coast AM. The station began broadcasting on March 5, 1952, and was originally owned by Carl H. Meyer.

References

External links
WCMY's website

CMY
News and talk radio stations in the United States
NRG Media radio stations
Radio stations established in 1952
1952 establishments in Illinois